Settimo railway station serves the town and comune of Settimo Torinese, in the Piedmont region, northwestern Italy. Opened in 1856, the station is a through station of the Turin-Milan railway and is a terminal of the Settimo-Pont Canavese railway.

Since 2012 it serves lines SFM1 and SFM2, part of the Turin metropolitan railway service.

Services

References

Railway stations in the Metropolitan City of Turin
Railway stations opened in 1856
Settimo Torinese